Lowland is an unincorporated community in Pamlico County, North Carolina, United States. Lowland has a post office with ZIP code 28552, which opened on November 17, 1884.

References

Unincorporated communities in Pamlico County, North Carolina
Unincorporated communities in North Carolina